Prince Edward is a station of the MTR rapid transit system in Hong Kong. It is located in Mong Kok, Kowloon, under the intersection of Nathan Road and Prince Edward Road West. The station is named after this road.

History
As Prince Edward was primarily designed as a cross-platform interchange between the Kwun Tong and s, although the Kwun Tong line tracks had already been built in 1979, the station was not used until the opening of the Tsuen Wan line on 10 May 1982. During the first week of operation, the station served only as an interchange with no exits to the concourse or street level. On 17 May 1982, all the station's exits were opened.

Prince Edward station attack 

During the evening of 31 August 2019, amid the anti-extradition bill protests, the Hong Kong Police stormed Prince Edward station and were filmed beating passengers and firing pepper spray inside railway carriages. The MTR closed the station during the incident, while the police refused to let medics enter. The station subsequently became a flashpoint for continued discord, with protesters petitioning MTR to release CCTV footage from the evening of 31 August. The incident at Prince Edward, as well as MTR's perceived kowtowing to Beijing (by closing stations near protests in the aftermath of criticism by Chinese state media for remaining operational), led to vandalism of other MTR stations. MTR condemned the vandalism and responded that the relevant CCTV footage would be kept for three years.

Location
Prince Edward station and Mong Kok station are the two closest stations in Hong Kong.

Station layout 

Prince Edward is an opposite-directional cross-platform interchange station for the southbound Kwun Tong line passengers going towards  and the southbound Tsuen Wan line passengers going towards . Mong Kok serves as the cross-platform interchange station for passengers travelling in the same direction.

Livery
The station's colour is light purple because of its association as a regal colour.

Entrances and exits 
All exits are within one block of Nathan Road, stretching from Prince Edward Road in the south to Playing Field Road in the north. Prince Edward station is primarily an interchange rather than a destination since there are only seven exits; the neighbouring Mong Kok has fifteen.

Transport connections

Cross-border bus services 
There are stops of cross-border buses to Shenzhen, Dongguan, and Guangzhou on Playing Field Road (exit A) or Portland Street (exits C2 and D).

Gallery

See also

 Prince Edward, Hong Kong
 2019 Prince Edward station attack

References

Mong Kok
MTR stations in Kowloon
Kwun Tong line
Tsuen Wan line
Railway stations in Hong Kong opened in 1982
1982 establishments in Hong Kong